Onšov is a municipality and village in Pelhřimov District in the Vysočina Region of the Czech Republic. It has about 200 inhabitants.

Administrative parts
Villages of Chlovy and Těškovice are administrative parts of Onšov.

References

Villages in Pelhřimov District